Charles H. Barbour is a politician from Charlottesville, Virginia. He served as the first Black mayor of Charlottesville from 1974 to 1976. Barbour was also the first African-American to be elected to the Charlottesville City Council (1970–1978), and was the first Black member of the Charlottesville Jaycees (Junior Chamber of Commerce). He relinquished his membership at the age of 35.

References 

Living people
Year of birth missing (living people)
Place of birth missing (living people)
Mayors of Charlottesville, Virginia
African-American mayors in Virginia
Virginia city council members
21st-century African-American people